The Faculdade de Filosofia, Ciências e Letras de Ribeirão Preto (abbreviated FFCLRP, and also known as Filô), is a liberal arts college (according to the French university tradition, in Brazil they nominate philosophy, sciences and letters as their undergraduate subjects, although some of these courses are not offered) of the University of São Paulo campus at Ribeirão Preto, São Paulo, Brazil. It was created in 1959, and incorporated into the University in 1974.

The school offers undergraduate courses (bachelor's and licentiate degrees) in several different areas such as visual arts education, biology, chemistry, health informatics, library and information sciences, medical physics, mathematics applied to business, music, pedagogy and psychology. It also harbors graduate programs in areas such as applied computing, chemistry, comparative biology, education, entomology, physics applied to biology and medicine, psychobiology, and psychology.

History
The FFCLRP was created by a decree of the State Government of São Paulo in October 1959, and its first activities began in March 1964. The official and definitive authorization came two years later, with a second governmental decree published in May 1966. Eventually, it was incorporated into the University of São Paulo in 1974.

The Biology, Psychology and Chemistry courses began in 1964, with the collaboration of the Medical School of Ribeirão Preto (FMRP), one of the medical schools of the University of São Paulo. The FMRP provided not only rooms for the operation of the courses, but mainly staff and professors. The first director of the FFCLRP was a medical professor, Dr. Lucien Lison. Later, the FFCLRP built its own premises in Ribeirão Preto, which currently occupy an area of 40.499.59 m².

Two characteristics were noteworthy at the beginning of the FFCLRP activities: the Propedeutic Cycle and the Course Conclusion Monograph. The Propedeutic Cycle was a one-year course comprising academic disciplines common to all courses. At the end of this cycle, each student should choose their respective area of specialty. Already at that time there was a concern with the basic interdisciplinary training of students, which would have a strong influence on their future research work. The students' preparation for scientific research was the second outstanding characteristic of the FFCLRP. Until 1971, students were required to develop research guided by one of the school professors. The results of these guided research acitivies were presented in the form of a monograph. Although the monograph was extinguished from the curricular structure as of 1972, the departments of Biology and Psychology and Education still maintain it as a requirement for the awarding of bachelor's or licentiate's degrees. In the Chemistry Department, the monograph was replaced by a 240-hour compulsory internship.

In 2010, the University Council of the University of São Paulo approved the restructuring of the Departments of the FFCLRP, which included the incorporation of the Department of Music, adding to a total of seven departments.

Former directors
 Lucien Alphonse Joseph Lison (1963-1969)
 Otávio Baracchini (1968-1968) 
 Geraldo Garcia Duarte (1978-1972)
 André Ricciardi Cruz (1972-1976)
 Renato Hélios Migliorini (1977-1981)
 Ernesto Giesbrecht (1981-1984)
 Ronaldo Zucchi (1984-1988)
 André Jacquemin (1988-1992)
 Lionel Segui Gonçalves (1992-1996)
 José Aparecido da Silva (1996-2000) 
 Oswaldo Baffa Filho (2000-2004) 
 Francisco de Assis Leone (2004-2008)
 Sebastião de Sousa Almeida (2008-2012)
 Fernando Luis Medina Mantelatto (2012-2016)

Departments

Currently, the FFCLRP comprises seven departments: Biology, Chemistry, Computer Science and Mathematics, Education, Information and Communication, Music, Psychology, and Physics. These Departments award bachelor's and licenciate degrees in Biology, Psychology, Pedagogy and Chemistry, as well as Information and Documentation, Medical Physics, Biomedical Informatics, Mathematics applied to Business, Technological Chemistry, Biotechnology and Agroindustry, Chemistry, Forensic Chemistry, Psychology, Artistic Education, and Music.

Undergraduate courses

The following Bachelor's and Licentiate degree courses are offered:

 Arts education
 Biology
 Chemistry (general, environmental, forensics and technical chemistry)
 Health informatics
 Library and information sciences
 Medical Physics
 Mathematics applied to Business
 Music (with distinct courses for singing and lyrical arts and musical instruments)
 Pedagogy
 Psychology

Graduate programs

FFCLRP has also an extensive graduate school, with programs in the following areas:

 Applied computing
 Chemistry
 Comparative biology
 Education
 Entomology
 Physics applied to Biology and Medicine
 Psychobiology
 Psychology

Associated facilities

There are several research laboratories and community outreach centers affiliated to FFCLRP, such as:

 Centro de Documentação da Biodiversidade (CDB);
 Centro Brasileiro de Investigações sobre o Desenvolvimento e Educação Infantil (CINDEDI);
 Centro de Ensino Integrado de Química (CEIQ);
 Centro de Instrumentação, Dosimetria e Radioproteção (CIDRA);
 Centro de Psicologia Aplicada (CPA)
 L@ife - Laboratório Interdisciplinar de Formação do Educador;
 Rede SACI - COM.VIVER - Centro de Informação e Convivência.

References

External links
 Home page.

University of São Paulo